Pecos is a village in San Miguel County, New Mexico, United States. The population was 1,392 at the 2010 census, shrinking slower than other parts of San Miguel County, partly because Pecos is within commuting distance of Santa Fe. The village is built along the Pecos River, which flows from the north out of the Santa Fe National Forest. Notable locations nearby include Pecos National Historical Park, Glorieta Pass, Pecos Benedictine Monastery, and Lisboa Springs Trout Hatchery. It is also an entry point for hunting, fishing, hiking and camping in the Pecos Wilderness. The closest metropolitan area is the Santa Fe metropolitan area, approximately 26 miles (42 km) to the west.

Geography
Pecos is located at  (35.580954, -105.678660).

Demographics

As of the census of 2000, there were 1,441 people, 542 households, and 383 families residing in the village. The population density was 830.3 people per square mile (319.8/km). There were 628 housing units at an average density of 361.9 per square mile (139.4/km). The racial makeup of the village was 68.91% White, 0.21% African American, 1.39% Native American, 0.21% Pacific Islander, 26.51% from other races, and 2.78% from two or more races. Hispanic or Latino of any race were 80.08% of the population.

There were 542 households, out of which 39.3% had children under the age of 18 living with them, 49.1% were married couples living together, 14.9% had a female householder with no husband present, and 29.2% were non-families. 24.2% of all households were made up of individuals, and 6.1% had someone living alone who was 65 years of age or older. The average household size was 2.63 and the average family size was 3.15.

In the village, the population was spread out, with 29.7% under the age of 18, 10.1% from 18 to 24, 29.6% from 25 to 44, 21.8% from 45 to 64, and 8.8% who were 65 years of age or older. The median age was 32 years. For every 100 females, there were 99.3 males. For every 100 females age 18 and over, there were 99.0 males.

The median income for a household in the village was $30,549, and the median income for a family was $33,828. Males had a median income of $28,625 versus $22,500 for females. The per capita income for the village was $13,306. About 13.0% of families and 15.9% of the population were below the poverty line, including 19.2% of those under age 18 and 22.6% of those age 65 or over.

Education
Pecos Independent Schools serves the Village of Pecos as well as rural areas in western San Miguel County.

References

External links
 National Park Service: Pecos National Historical Park
  U.S. Forest Service: Santa Fe National Forest. Pecos/Las Vegas Ranger District
 Pecos Conference
 San Miguel County Plan
 

Villages in San Miguel County, New Mexico
Villages in New Mexico